Irena is a village in north central Worth County, Missouri, United States. The population was 14 at the 2020 census.

Geography
Irena is located just east of US Route 169 on County Road 223. The Missouri-Iowa border is  1.4 miles to the north and Grant City is four miles to the south along Route 169. The headwaters of Jay Creek arise just to the west of the community.

History
Irena was laid out in 1876, and named after Irena, England, the ancestral home of the wife of a first settler. A post office called Irena was established in 1883, and remained in operation until 1932.

Demographics

2010 census
As of the census of 2010, there were 18 people, 7 households, and 5 families residing in the village. The racial makeup of the village was 100.0% White.

There were 7 households, of which 42.9% had children under the age of 18 living with them, 57.1% were married couples living together, 14.3% had a female householder with no husband present, and 28.6% were non-families. 14.3% of all households were made up of individuals. The average household size was 2.57 and the average family size was 3.00.

The median age in the village was 48 years. 22.2% of residents were under the age of 18; 11.3% were between the ages of 18 and 24; 11.2% were from 25 to 44; 33.3% were from 45 to 64; and 22.2% were 65 years of age or older. The gender makeup of the village was 44.4% male and 55.6% female.

2000 census
As of the census of 2000, there were 33 people, 9 households, and 9 families residing in the village. The population density was 32.8 people per square mile (12.6/km2). There were 9 housing units at an average density of 8.9 per square mile (3.4/km2). The racial makeup of the village was 100.00% White.

There were 9 households, out of which 55.6% had children under the age of 18 living with them, 100.0% were married couples living together, and 0.0% were non-families. No households were made up of individuals, and none had someone living alone who was 65 years of age or older. The average household size was 3.67 and the average family size was 3.44.

In the village, the population was spread out, with 45.5% under the age of 18, 24.2% from 25 to 44, 24.2% from 45 to 64, and 6.1% who were 65 years of age or older. The median age was 30 years. For every 100 females, there were 106.3 males. For every 100 females age 18 and over, there were 100.0 males.

The median income for a household in the village was $31,875, and the median income for a family was $31,875. Males had a median income of $26,250 versus $28,750 for females. The per capita income for the village was $12,605. None of the population and none of the families were below the poverty line.

References

Villages in Worth County, Missouri
Villages in Missouri